Nick A. Corcodilos, a professional recruiter, publishes the Ask The Headhunter website, created in 1995, where he and his audience candidly discuss job hunting and hiring.

Corcodilos holds a bachelor's degree (Phi Beta Kappa) from Rutgers University, and a Masters in Cognitive Psychology from Stanford University. Corcodilos is president of North Bridge Group, and has been retained by organizations to teach their employees effective career development methods, and their managers effective recruiting and hiring methods. Clients have included the Executive MBA programs at Cornell, Wharton, UCLA, Northwestern, University of Michigan, Rutgers and Harvard. 

Corcodilos is the author of Fearless Job Hunting: Overcome the daunting obstacles that stop other job hunters dead in their tracks, How to Work with Headhunters... and how to make headhunters work for you, How Can I Change Careers?, Keep Your Salary Under Wraps. and Ask The Headhunter: Reinventing The Interview to Win The Job. This book went out of print in 2010.

Since 2002 Corcodilos has been publishing the weekly, e-mail Ask The Headhunter Newsletter in a Q&A format where he answers questions from subscribers and delivers hints and tips for job hunters and employers. From 2008-2010 the Universal Press Syndicate distributed features from Ask The Headhunter.

Since 1995 Corcodilos's articles have been featured in The Wall Street Journal, Reader's Digest, USA Today, The New York Times, Fast Company, and Working Woman. His Ask The Headhunter feature column has appeared on PBS NewsHour since 2012. Corcodilos has been featured on CNN, CNBC, Fox News, Bloomberg, National Public Radio and MSNBC, Electronic Engineering Times, InfoWorld, TechRepublic, Dice.com and Adobe Systems' marketing community, CMO.com. In July 2009 Corcodilos was a weekly guest at the Brian Lehrer Show, WNYC radio. In 2012 Corcodilos was featured in a CBC Television Marketplace (Canadian TV program) program, "Recruitment Rip-Off".

References

External links
Ask The HeadHunter

Year of birth missing (living people)
Living people
Stanford University alumni
American non-fiction writers